Florieda Batson (born November 20, 1900, New Orleans, Louisiana; died January 31, 1996, New Orleans) was an American hurdler and captain of the United States team at the Women's Olympics in Paris in 1922.

Biography
Batson was the youngest of three children born to Robert Percy Batson, a successful New Orleans businessman, and his wife Florieda Burton Batson.  Mrs. Batson died when Florieda was 3, and Florieda's two older brothers died in accidents.  Mr. Batson sent Florieda to live with relatives in Alabama and New York, and she attended Rosemary Hall Academy (later Choate Rosemary Hall) in Connecticut.

At Rosemary, Batson learned hurdling as well as playing field hockey and basketball.  She quickly became the leading American short-distance female hurdler; Batson was undefeated between 1919 and 1921 and set U.S. records in the 60-yard high hurdles (9.0 seconds) and the 100-yard low hurdles (14.4 seconds).

After graduating from Rosemary, Batson enrolled at Smith College. In 1922, she was invited to join the team of 13 U.S. women attending the 1922 Women's Olympics, an event organized by French women's athletics pioneer Alice Milliat.  The team, mostly consisting of East Coast prep school and college students like Batson, chose her as captain.

At the Paris games, Batson sprained her left ankle when she hit a hurdle during the team's first practice.  She won her qualifying heat, but failed to finish the final when her injured ankle caused her to fall.

After the Women's Olympics, Batson returned to New Orleans, where she married local businessman William J. Gibbens, Jr.  The couple had two daughters.  When Florieda Batson Gibbens died in 1996, she was survived by 11 grandchildren and 24 great-grandchildren.

References
 Jeff Duncan, "History in the Making: Florieda Batson was among 13 pioneers who comprised the first American women's Olympic team", New Orleans Times-Picayune, July 9, 2008.

1900 births
1996 deaths
American female hurdlers
Track and field athletes from New Orleans
Choate Rosemary Hall alumni
Smith College alumni
20th-century American women
20th-century American people